The entry Church of San Francesco includes churches linked to the devotion to St Francis of Assisi (San Francesco in Italian) and the Franciscan order. They mainly include churches or monasteries in the Italian peninsula in the following cities/towns and regions:

 San Francesco, Acquasparta, Umbria
 San Francesco alle Scale, Ancona, Marche
 San Francesco, Arezzo, Tuscany
 San Francesco, Assisi or Basilica of Saint Francis of Assisi, Umbria
 San Francesco, Atri, Abruzzo
 San Francesco, Bologna or Basilica of San Francesco, Bologna, Reggio-Emilia
 San Francesco, Canicattì, Sicily
 San Francesco, Casalbuttano, Lombardy
 San Francesco, Cortona, Tuscany
 San Francesco di Paola, Florence, Tuscany
 San Francesco, Grosseto, Tuscany
 San Francesco, Larino, Molise
 San Francesco, Lucca, Tuscany
 San Francesco, Lucignano, Tuscany
 San Francesco, Mantua, Lombardy
 San Francesco, Modena, Emilia Romagna
 San Francesco, Mondavio, Marche
 San Francesco delle Monache, Naples, Campania
 San Francesco di Paola, Naples, Campania
 San Francesco, Orvieto, Umbria
 San Francesco, Palermo or San Francesco d'Assisi, Palermo, Sicily
 San Francesco, Pescia, Tuscany
 San Francesco, Piacenza, Emilia Romagna
 San Francesco, Pisa, Tuscany
 San Francesco, Prato, Tuscany
 Santissime Stimmate di San Francesco, Rome, Lazio
 San Francesco a Ripa, Rome, Lazio
 San Francesco, San Gemini, Umbria
 San Francesco, San Marino, San Marino
 San Francesco, Siena or Basilica of San Francesco, Siena, Tuscany,
 San Francesco, Urbania, Marche
 San Francesco della Vigna, Venice, Veneto
 San Francesco, Viterbo, Lazio
 San Francesco, Terni, Umbria

See also 
 Iglesia de San Francisco (disambiguation)